Zhihu is a forum website where questions are created, answered, edited, and organized by its users. Originally based in Chengdu and with creators from Sichuan, China, the website launched on January 26, 2011. The number of registered users on Zhihu exceeded 10 million by the end of 2013, and reached 17 million as of May 2015, with 250 million monthly page views. By the end of 2018, the number of registered users of Zhihu exceeded 220 million and the website accumulated more than 30 million questions and 130 million answers.

History 

Zhihu began development in August 2010. It went through a closed beta test at the end of December 2010. The final product went online on January 26, 2011. It has reportedly received funding from Kai-Fu Lee's Innovation Works, Qiming Ventures, SAIF Partners, Tencent, and Sogou.

In October 2011, Zhihu completed its A-round of funding for 7 million USD from Innovation Works and Qiming Ventures.

In 2015, Zhihu completed its C-round of funding for 55 million USD.

In 2017, Zhihu officially commercialized. In August 2018, Zhihu completed its E-round of funding, raising 270 million USD for a total company valuation at 2.5 billion USD. On August 12, 2019, Zhihu completed a subsequent F-round of funding led by Chinese short video platform Kuaishou and technology company Baidu, garnering 450 million USD. As a result, Baidu mobile app searches would directly return Zhihu content.

In December 2021, ten of Zhihu's shareholders, including Sogou and Tencent's investment arm, sold all of their stakes (78% ownership) in Beijing Zhizhe Tianxia Technology, the parent company of Zhihu. All shares were transferred to the founder and CEO, Zhou Yuan, who owned more than 99% of the company thereafter. This occurred three days after regulatory pressures from the Beijing branch of the Cyberspace Administration of China (CAC), during which Zhihu was instructed to rectify practices that had led to unlawful release of information.

Zhihu's initial public offering on the New York Stock Exchange came on March 26, 2021. Zhihu started trading on the Hong Kong Stock Exchange on April 11, 2022.

Product operation
Zhihu functions similarly to Quora, where users may submit questions and answers, as well as upvote the best answer. Zhihu also features expert panels and daily and weekly newsletters.

Initially, user registration was primarily invitation-only, with referrals needed from a couple hundred registered users. Otherwise, new users had to apply to join by filling in a large amount of personal information and waiting for a reply. Zhihu sought to host professional questions and answers, and then over time attract a more general community.

Zhihu started open registration in March 2013. Registered users are able to ask questions and invite specific users to answer. Each user is able to check their Zhihu followers' updates (Likes, Answers, Following questions). On the home page, users are able to check the status of their own questions, as well as the activities around their answers and comments.

The site generates revenue through advertisements, e-books, and paid questioning of certain experts.

See also 
 List of question-and-answer websites

References

External links
 

Companies listed on the New York Stock Exchange
Internet properties established in 2011
Chinese websites
Question-and-answer websites
Companies based in Beijing
Privately held companies of China
Chinese brands
2011 establishments in China
2021 initial public offerings